Crime Stories is an American documentary crime television program that was broadcast on Court TV/TruTV from January 8, 1998, to December 2010. The program was hosted by Bill Courage, and featured the investigation of crimes, including the apprehension of suspects and the subsequent interviewing by police and the trial of the suspects, whilst exploring the complexities of the American legal system. It also featured notorious historical criminals such as Al Capone, Adolf Eichmann, Sam Sheppard, Richard Ramirez and John Wayne Gacy.

References

External links

1990s American documentary television series
2000s American documentary television series
2010s American documentary television series
1998 American television series debuts
2010 American television series endings
English-language television shows
TruTV original programming